York is an unincorporated community in Jefferson County, in the U.S. state of Ohio.

History
York was laid out in 1815. A post office was established at York in the 1830s.

References

Unincorporated communities in Jefferson County, Ohio
Unincorporated communities in Ohio